Eunica tatila, the Florida purplewing, is a species of tropical brushfoot in the butterfly family Nymphalidae. It is found in North America.

The MONA or Hodges number for Eunica tatila is 4533.

Subspecies
These four subspecies belong to the species Eunica tatila:
 Eunica tatila bellaria Fruhstorfer, 1908
 Eunica tatila cerula Godman & Salvin, 1877
 Eunica tatila tatila (Herrich-Schäffer, 1855)
 Eunica tatila tatilista Kaye, 1926

References

Further reading

 

Biblidinae
Articles created by Qbugbot
Butterflies described in 1855